Pseudhippopsis gracilis is a species of beetle in the family Cerambycidae. It was described by Fahraeus in 1872.

References

Agapanthiini
Beetles described in 1872